King Fahad Academy (KFA) is a private school in Acton in the London Borough of Ealing that provides an Islamic-based education for children aged from 3 to 18. The school is on the former site of the now closed Faraday High School (closed 1984).

It is a registered charity under English law, and the chairman of the board of trustees is Prince Mohammed Bin Nawaf Bin Abdul Aziz Al Saud.

The school was founded in September 1985 under the authority of King Fahad Bin Abd Al-Aziz Al-Saud and caters to the children of Saudi diplomats, Arab Muslims, and the local community in London.

Textbook Controversy

In February 2007, the school was featured on BBC's Newsnight programme. The school's director, Dr. Sumaya Aluyusuf, defended the use of Saudi textbooks describing religions other than Islam as "worthless" and comparing their adherents to pigs and monkeys. The books were later edited, and the controversial descriptions removed as they were found to not adhere to Islamic beliefs of equality and peace.

See also

 List of schools in Ealing
 British International School, Riyadh
 British International School of Jeddah
 British International School Al-Khobar
 List of things named after Saudi Kings

References

External links
 Official website
 Official website 
 Ofsted: King Fahad Academy
 Edubase: King Fahad Academy

1985 establishments in England
Acton, London
Charities based in London
Educational institutions established in 1985
Private co-educational schools in London
Private schools in the London Borough of Ealing
International schools in London
Islamic schools in London
Saudi Arabian international schools